Hasbeya or Hasbeiya is a town in Lebanon, situated at the foot of Mount Hermon, overlooking a deep amphitheatre from which a brook flows to the Hasbani. In 1911, the population was about 5000.

Hasbaya is the capital of the Wadi El Taym, a long fertile valley running parallel to the western foot of Mount Hermon. Watered by the Hasbani river, the low hills of Wadi El Taym are covered with rows of silver-green olive trees, its most important source of income. Villagers also produce honey, grapes, figs, prickly pears, pine nuts and other fruit.

Mount Hermon, 2745 metres high, is a unifying presence throughout the Wadi El Taym. This imposing mountain held great religious significance for the Canaanites and Phoenicians, who called it the seat of the All High. The Romans, recognising it as a holy site, built many temples on its slopes. Some identify Hasbaya with the Old Testament's "Baal – Hermon," while in the New Testament the mountain is the site of the transfiguration of Jesus.

Hasbaya is mainly inhabited by the Druze, with some Christians. In 1826, an American Protestant mission was established in the town. The castle in Hasbaya was held by the crusaders under Count Oran, but in 1171 the Emirs of the Chehab family captured it after defeating the crusaders in a number of battles. In 1205 this family was confirmed in the lordship of the town and district, which they held till the present time.

Near Hasbaya were bitumen pits which were worked in antiquity and in the 19th century up to 1914. Production may have peaked at about 500 tons/year. To the north, at the source of the Hasbani, the ground is volcanic. Some travellers have attempted to identify Hasbeya with the biblical Baal-Gad or Baal-Hermon.

The town of Hasbaya is the centre of the district and can be reached from Marjeyun across the Hasbani bridge, or from Rachaya. It is one of the most important and oldest towns of the Mount Hermon area. This mountain peak, also called Jabal al Sheikh, rises east of Hasbaya. The town is watered by a small tributary of the Hasbani River.

Hasbaya is an important historical site, but little of its ancient monuments survive. The oldest standing ruins date to the Crusader period. After the conquest of the area by the Chehabs Emirs in 1172, they fortified the square tower of the Crusader fort and transformed it into a big palace similar to Italian palaces and citadels of the Renaissance. On both sides of its main entrance is the lion, the emblem of the Shehab family. The upper floor has 65 rooms, and the largest is decorated with beautiful wall paintings. The mosque was built in the 13th century and has a beautiful hexagonal minaret.

Hasbaya keeps its traditions alive and its workshops are still producing traditional clothing such as abayas, caftans and turbans.

In the direction of Marjeyun and also part of the Hasbaya Caza (3 km away from the town), there is Souk al Khan, which is located inside a pine forest at the crossing of Hasbaya, Rashaya, Kawkaba and Marjeyun roads.

There lies the ruins of an old khan where Ali, son of Fakhreddin Maan, was killed in a battle with the Ottoman army. In this khan, a popular weekly market held very Tuesday is visited by traders and visitors from all over the area. Near this site flows the Hasbani, a tributary of the Jordan River, which is under Israeli control. On the banks of this river are scattered outdoor restaurants serving delicious Lebanese food and trout.

Historical site

Hasbaya is an attractive town full of history. A good deal of this history transpired at the huge citadel that is today Hasbaya’s chief claim to fame. Owned by the Chehab emirs, the citadel forms the major part of a Chehabi compound – a group of buildings surrounding an unpaved central square 150 metres long and 100 metres wide. Several medieval houses and a mosque make up the rest of the compound, which covers a total of 20,000 square metres. The citadel is situated on a hill overlooking a river which encircles it from the north. A site steeped in mystery, the citadel is so old its origins are uncertain and so big that even today no one is sure how many rooms it contains. The known history of the structure begins with the Crusaders, but it may go back even earlier to an Arab fortification or a Roman building. Won by the Chehabs from the Crusaders in 1172, the fortress was rebuilt by its new owners.

Since then it has been burned many times in battle and was often the scene of bloody conflict. In the 20th century, it was struck by rockets during the Israeli occupation of South Lebanon. Amazingly, for almost all of the eight centuries since it fell to the Chehabs, the citadel has been occupied by members of the same family. Today actual ownership is shared by some fifty branches of the family, some of whom live there permanently.

The Citadel

The building consists of three floors above ground and three subterranean floors. Constructed in stages, often damaged and rebuilt, today the sprawling structure incorporate a mix of styles, building techniques and states of repair. The tower in the southwest corner and the eastern wall-both visible from the third floor – are easily identifiable as Crusader. Other medieval elements are arrow slit windows and machicolations-small openings through which hot oil or missiles were dropped on the enemy. Despite its primary function as a fortress, the castle also possesses many graceful architectural features such as slender columns and arched windows Entrance and First Courtyard.

Wide steps lead to the main entrance, where the original Crusader door still swings smoothly on 800-year-old hinges. Four metres wide and three metres high, the passage allowed horsemen to enter the castle without dismounting.

Stone lions, a heraldic emblem of the Chehab family, decorate the wall on either side of the arched portal. Two large lions are depicted in chains, each beside a weak, unchained rabbit. A set of smaller lions appears within the arch above the doorway and just below that is a plaque in Arabic commemorating an addition to the castle made in the year 1009 Hejira by Emir Ali Chehab some 400 years ago. Once through the portal, you enter a huge stone paved courtyard surrounded by castle walls 1.5 meters thick. In addition to the attractive windows, old balconies and staircases, the courtyard has four main points of interest: a limited view of the dungeons, two important arched entrenches and a wing once occupied by the Pasha of Egypt In a corner to the right the main entry gate is the only glimpse the modern visitor will get of the dungeons. Through a break in the wall one can look down on the room where the ruler of the citadel once sheltered. If necessary, he could escape from here through special tunnels: one leading to the Abu Djaj river north of the castle, and the other to the mosque. Now closed off by the Lebanese Directorate General of Antiquities, the three subterranean floors possess their work own dark history. Crusaders buried their dead here and prisoners were kept in its dungeons.

During the citadel’s heyday the lower floors were also used to store water and other suppliers, as well as to house animals. At the far end of the courtyard is a wine arched opening set in a wall of alternating black and white stone. This was the entrance of the "diwan" or salon of Sitt Chams, wife of Bechir Chehab II, governor of Mount Lebanon between 1788 and 1840. To the left of the diwan is the wing occupied by ibrahim Pasha of Egypt during his campaign against the Ottomans in 1838. Another, higher entrance, in a wall of yellow and white stone, once gave onto a Crusader church, which was long ago destroyed. The rooms surrounding the lower courtyard, including what was once the stables, are now used for storage.

Overlooking the modern village of Hasbaya in south Lebanon, the Chehabi Citadel occupied a strategic location for the armies of the First Crusade, who are believed to have built the original fortifications in the eleventh century. The strategically sited outpost was also used by the Chehabi emirs, who ousted the Crusaders from the area in the 1170s and rebuilt much of the citadel complex for military and residential use. Chehabi descendants have continually occupied the site up until this day.
 
The 20,000-square-meter complex is centered around a large unpaved courtyard and contains residential buildings and a mosque. Its main portal features a carved image of a lion, the emblem of the Chehabi family. Expanded and renovated over the course of some eight and a half centuries, the building retains elements of Mamluk and Ottoman architecture and interior decoration.

Almost a millennium of occupation and war, combined with a lack of maintenance and drainage problems have left the citadel battered, with portions of it in danger of structural failure. A recent preliminary study of the conditions of the complex revealed that load-bearing walls of the buildings and fortifications are under stress and cracking. Some of the interior vaults and ceilings have collapsed or are nearing collapse, and architectural and interior decoration require additional assessment and repairs.

The Lebanese Foundation for the Preservation of the Emirs Chehabi Citadel–Hasbaya, led by a member of the Chehabi family, has been established for the purpose of conserving the complex. The foundation has raised some funds for the study of its condition, but additional resources are required to address the urgent stabilization of failing structures as a first phase of a long-term plan for the conservation of this historically significant site. This includes its eventual rehabilitation as a tourist attraction and cultural center that would generate revenue sufficient to maintain it.

Notable natives/residents
 Faris al-Khoury, Prime Minister of Syria (1944–1945, 1954–1958)
 Emir Khaled Chehab, Lebanese prime minister (1937, 1952 - 1953), minister of finance (1927 - 1928), deputy, and speaker of parliament (1936 - 1937).
 Assad Kotaite, International Civil Aviation Organization official, Secretary-General (1970–1976), and Council President (1976–2006)

1860 conflict 
The Prince of Wales toured the Middle East in the early 1860s, and he and his party stopped Hasbaya on their way to Damascus. The Prince was told that between 800 and 1,000 Christians were killed here by the Druze in the fighting during 1860.

See also
 Chehab family
 Druze in Lebanon

References

Bibliography
 
     (p.     50)
 (pp. 132, 133)

External links
Hasbaiya, Localiban

Populated places in Hasbaya District
Druze communities in Lebanon